Mongi Hamdi (born 23 April 1959) is a United Nations official who was appointed interim foreign minister of Tunisia by Prime Minister Mehdi Jomaa. He served from 29 January 2014 until his appointment as Special Representative and Head of the United Nations Multidimensional Integrated Stabilization Mission in Mali by United Nations Secretary-General Ban Ki Moon on 12 December 2014; he resigned from this position after just a year amid difficulties implementing a peace deal and improving security in the north of the country.

Hamdi has worked for over 25 years with the United Nations and has had high level positions with UNCTAD, the United Nations Conference on Trade and Development, and with DESA, the United Nations Department of Economic and Social Affairs.

Hamdi studied at the University of Southern California, and the National Engineering School of Tunis and holds a doctorate degree from the former, and an engineering degree from the latter. He further earned a certificate in macro-engineering policy and management from Harvard University.

References 

1959 births
Living people
Foreign ministers of Tunisia
Tunisian officials of the United Nations
Special Representatives of the Secretary-General of the United Nations
University of Southern California alumni